Dieulouard (formerly Dieulwart) is a commune in the Meurthe-et-Moselle department in north-eastern France. Dieulouard is located between Pont-à-Mousson and Nancy, on the left bank of the Moselle. It is the location of the Gallo-Roman city of Scarpone.

In August 1608 a small group of exiled English Benedictines were given a deserted collegiate church in the town. The church was dedicated to St Laurence and so the monks adopted him as the patron of their community.  During the French Revolution the community was forced to flee France. In 1802 the monks settled at Ampleforth Abbey in North Yorkshire.

See also
 Communes of the Meurthe-et-Moselle department
 Parc naturel régional de Lorraine

References

External links

 Official website

Communes of Meurthe-et-Moselle
Leuci
Gallia Belgica
Three Bishoprics